This is a list of Bahamians, who are identified with The Bahamas through residential, legal, historical, or cultural means, grouped by their area of notability.

Artists

Business people 
 Pauline Allen-Dean  first woman to become manager of a commercial bank and the first woman to serve as managing director of a commercial bank
 Garet 'Tiger' Finlayson OBE  owner of Solomon Mines (luxury retail goods), Burns House and Butler & Sands
Sherrexcia (Rexy) Rolle Vice-president of Operations & General Counsel of Western Air

Entertainers 

 

 Etta Cameron jazz singer; based in Denmark; frontrunner of the Danish 1970s and 1980s music scene
 Wendy Coakley-Thompson writer; author of the novels Back to Life (2004) and What You Won't Do for Love (2005)
 Langston Fishburne – actor, son of Laurence Fishburne
 "King" Eric Gibson entrepreneur and musician; semi-official Ambassador of Bahamian Goodwill
 Lenny Kravitz actor, multi-instrumentalist, music arranger, record producer and rock singer-songwriter; son of Roxie Roker
 Zoë Kravitz – actress and musician; daughter of Lenny Kravitz
 Shakara Ledard super model
 Myles Munroe televangelist 
Tia Mowry – actress 
Tamera Mowry – actress
 Sir Sidney Poitier actor and diplomat; Ambassador of the Bahamas to Japan 
 Roxie Roker actress; known for role on the television series The Jeffersons
 Angelique Sabrina teenage actor, dancer and singer-songwriter
 Persia White actress; known for role on the television series Girlfriends

Politicians

 Perry Christie became Prime Minister of the Bahamas in 2012
 Frederick Gottlieb – former MP and FNM activist 
 Hubert Ingraham former Prime Minister of the Bahamas
 Sir Lynden Pindling former Prime Minister of the Bahamas
 Allan Glaisyer Minns first Black Mayor in Britain
 Brandon Russell  Founder of the Neo-Nazi Atomwaffen Division

Sportspeople 
 
 
 

Deandre Ayton – No.1 overall pick in the 2018 NBA Draft, NBA player for Phoenix Suns 
 Shaunae Miller professional sprinter
 Edner Cherry professional boxer
 André Deveaux retired professional NHL ice hockey player
 Yves Edwards mixed martial artist
 Debbie Ferguson-McKenzie Olympian/Golden Girl and sprint athlete
 Rick Fox actor and retired professional basketball player; former National Basketball Association player for the Los Angeles Lakers 
Eric Gordon – NBA player
 Steven Gardiner professional sprinter
 Buddy Hield NBA player; consensus NCAA Division I player of the year in 2015–16
 Tureano Johnson – boxer
 Mark Knowles professional tennis player
 Antoan Richardson Major League baseball player and coach
 Myron Rolle professional football player; former National Football League player for the Tennessee Titans; Rhodes scholar
 Chadwick Russell
 Kimbo Slice streetfighter turned mixed martial artist
 Ryan Sweeting professional tennis player
Klay Thompson – NBA player for the Golden State Warriors
 Mychal Thompson professional basketball player; former National Basketball Association player for the Portland Trail Blazers and the Los Angeles Lakers; nicknamed "Sweet Bells"
 Tonique Williams-Darling 2004 Olympic gold medalist (400m), 2005 IAAF World Champion, she split the Golden League – Million Dollar Jackpot ($500,000) by winning eight consecutive 400m events in the championship series; Bahamian government named a major highway the "Tonique Williams-Darling Highway"

Celebrities and billionaires
The Bahamas has one of the largest registers of celebrities who reside permanently or have legal resident status in a country, not of their native birth, hometown, or place of origin. This is primarily due to the favourable financial sector that is tax free (from income, capital gains, inheritance, among others) and is one of the top three worldwide centres in offshore banking. Also, there is a high-quality tourism product, ranking first in the Caribbean and Atlantic region among island destinations. Another is a favorable immigration policy toward wealthy nationals. Those who invest $500,000 in property can be eligible for permanent residential status.

 Nicolas Cage - owns estate residence on Paradise Island and a private island in the Exuma chains.
 Mariah Carey - owns a house on Windermere, a private island connected to Eleuthera, where she married Nick Cannon in 2008.
 Sean "Diddy" Combs
 Sean Connery - owned a property in Lyford Cay; had lived in the Bahamas since the 1990s
 David Copperfield
 Johnny Depp - owns private island
 Rick Fox - Bahamian/Canadian
 Bill Gates
 Michael Jordan
 Lenny Kravitz
 Joe Lewis (British businessman) - British billionaire (347th richest person on Forbes list of billionaires), owns a property in Lyford Cay
 Terry Manning - American record producer, operator of Compass Point Studios
 Tim McGraw and Faith Hill - own private island
 Shakira Mebarak
 Eddie Murphy
 Daniel Nestor
 Peter Nygard - Canadian billionaire
 Stephen O'Brien - politician
 Mike Oldfield - guitarist/composer (Tubular Bells etc.)
 Sidney Poitier - Bahamian
 Anna Nicole Smith (28 November 1967 – 8 February 2007)
 John Travolta
 Tiger Woods - owns the Albany Estate
 Louis Bacon - billionaire American investor, hedge fund manager, and philanthropist. Owns property in Lyford Cay.

See also

Bahamian Americans
 List of Bahamian Americans
 Afro-Bahamians 
African diaspora in the Americas
Afro-Caribbean
 List of people on stamps of the Bahamas
 List of residents of the Bahamas

References

External links
 People of the Bahamas